The Yalobusha River is a river,  long, in north-central Mississippi in the United States.  It is a principal tributary of the Yazoo River, via which it is part of the watershed of the Mississippi River.

The name "Yalobusha" comes from the Choctaw word yalooboshi, meaning "little tadpole", from yalooba, "tadpole", and -ushi, "diminutive". The United States Board on Geographic Names settled on the river's name in 1892.  According to the Geographic Names Information System, it has also been known as "Yallabusha" and as the "Yellowbushy River."

Course
The Yalobusha River rises in Chickasaw County, northwest of the town of Houston, and flows generally west-southwestwardly through Calhoun, Grenada and Leflore Counties, past the town of Grenada.  At Greenwood it joins the Tallahatchie River to form the Yazoo River.

Much of the Yalobusha's course through Calhoun County has been straightened and channelized; this section of the river is also known as the "Yalobusha River Canal."  In Grenada County, the river is impounded by a U.S. Army Corps of Engineers dam to form Grenada Lake, which collects the Yalobusha's largest tributary, the Skuna River. 
The Yalobusha at Grenada, MS averages a discharge of 2,436 cubic feet per second.

Major tributaries

 Big Sand Creek
 Skuna River
 Batupan Bogue
 Topashaw Creek

See also
List of Mississippi rivers

References

External links
Grenada Lake

Sources
Columbia Gazetter of North America entry
DeLorme (1998).  Mississippi Atlas & Gazetteer.  Yarmouth, Maine: DeLorme.  .

Rivers of Mississippi
Bodies of water of Calhoun County, Mississippi
Bodies of water of Chickasaw County, Mississippi
Bodies of water of Grenada County, Mississippi
Bodies of water of Leflore County, Mississippi
Mississippi placenames of Native American origin